Pipkins (originally Inigo Pipkin) is a British children's TV programme. Hartley Hare, Pig, Topov, Octavia and the gang were the stars of ATV's pre-school series which ran from January 1973 to 29 December 1981.

Pipkins was one of the first children's programmes on British TV where the characters had regional accents: Pig had a Birmingham accent; Topov the monkey was a Cockney; Octavia the ostrich had a French accent; Pigeon had an Upper class English accent; Mrs Penguin had a Geordie accent; Uncle Hare had a West Country English accent; Sophie the cat had a non-regional English accent; and Moony the Badger had a Northern Ireland accent.

Origins
In 1972, the ITV network expanded its daytime broadcasting hours and the Independent Broadcasting Authority commissioned four of the main ITV companies to each provide a series of interest to pre-schoolers, as an alternative to the successful US import Sesame Street. From this commission Thames Television came up with Rainbow, Yorkshire with Mister Trimble, Granada with Hickory House, while ATV's contribution would be Inigo Pipkin.

Inigo Pipkin was first shown on New Year's Day 1973. When the show started, the main character was an elderly puppet maker called Inigo Pipkin (hence the original title), played by George Woodbridge.  The puppets were his creations, and over the course of the first series, viewers saw Inigo bring to life Hartley Hare and the Tortoise (a.k.a. George) played by Nigel Plaskitt; and Topov the monkey, Pig and Octavia the ostrich, all played by Heather Tobias.

However, Woodbridge died suddenly from a heart attack in March 1973, while recording of the second series was still taking place. Inigo Pipkin was not recorded in the order it was transmitted, and Woodbridge had only completed taping of the latter episodes. The scripts for the episodes that would be broadcast first in the transmission run, i.e. those that Woodbridge had not managed to record, were thus hastily rewritten, with Inigo's absence explained by his being away on a fishing holiday.

In 1974, in a first for children's television, the death of Inigo was worked into the programme, predating the Mr Hooper episode on Sesame Street by nine years. From this episode onwards, the show was renamed Pipkins and Inigo's assistant, Johnny (Wayne Laryea), took over.  The direction of the programme had to change; from here on, the show ceased to centre around a puppet workshop and the characters became the 'Help People', helping anyone in need of a hand. Similarly, another episode "Death of a Goldfish" dealt with the topic of death, in regards to losing a pet. Topov the monkey and Johnny discussed why the goldfish died and why people die.

Johnny left Pipkins around 1978, to be replaced by Tom (Jonathan Kydd), who moved on in 1980, his place taken by Peter Potter (Paddy O'Hagan). In later years Sue Nicholls made regular appearances as the Pipkins' neighbour, Mrs Muddle. The name was somewhat ironic as she was always a calming, self-assured presence around the puppets.

The familiar workshop set was replaced in 1979 (in the story "Moving Out"), with new interiors based around a kitchen and backyard.  The new set was built up from ground level to enable puppeteers to work standing up and to move around more freely, modelled on the methods used by The Muppet Show which was also filmed at ATV Elstree Studios.

Cancellation
Pipkins ended when ATV lost its franchise for the Midlands ITV region, was restructured and became Central Independent Television. The programme was replaced by Let's Pretend.

The series was made at ATV Elstree studios, with occasional filming on location. For the Inigo Pipkin episodes, the opening and closing titles were sung by Jackie Lee, who had earlier sung the themes to children's programmes The Adventures of Rupert Bear and White Horses.

Unusually for a children's programme, there was no spin-off Pipkins merchandise (toys, games, books etc.) produced during the programme's run.

Archive status
In common with other 1970s shows, several Pipkins episodes recorded on 625 line PAL Colour Videotape – including the very first Inigo Pipkin — are missing from the archives (poor storage of former ATV master colour videotapes has led to the loss of many shows), and not even any 16mm Black & White Film copies of the lost episodes exist.

Out of a total of 333 episodes, only 135 have survived. The other 197 episodes no longer exist in any format, while two others exist on 625 line PAL Colour Videotape only as incomplete copies (possibly due to videotape damage caused by poor storage). Nigel Plaskitt — who provided the show's narration, as well as voicing and operating Hartley and Tortoise – made off-air domestic videocassette recordings of around 56 episodes, now the only format in which these are known to exist, and some have been used for the DVD release in the UK.

Cast

Characters
 Hartley Hare
 Topov Monkey
 Tortoise
 Pig
 Mooney Badger
 Octavia Ostrich

References

External links
Official Pipkins website
British Film Institute Screen Online

1973 British television series debuts
1981 British television series endings
ITV children's television shows
1970s British children's television series
1980s British children's television series
1970s preschool education television series
1980s preschool education television series
British preschool education television series
British television shows featuring puppetry
Television series by ITV Studios
English-language television shows
Television shows produced by Associated Television (ATV)
Television series about rabbits and hares
Television shows shot at ATV Elstree Studios